Emil Vogt (died 1967) was a footballer who played as midfielder during the early 1900s.

Football career
Vogt joined FC Basel's first team for their 1904–05 season. Vogt played his domestic league debut for the club in the home game in the Landhof on 27 November 1904 as Basel won 3–0 against FC Weissenbühl Bern.

In the Swiss Serie A seasons 1904–05 and 1908–09 Vogt played at least five games for Basel. At least four of these games were in the Swiss Series A and one was a friendly game. He probably played more games than mentioned, but the documentation is not available. 

It may be presumed that in the intermediate seasons Vogt played for the club's reserve team, who at that time played in the Serie C the third tier of Swiss football.

Notes

Footnotes

Incomplete league matches 1904–05 season: FCB-Bern, OB-FCB, FCB-YB

Incomplete 1908–09 season league matches: FCB-YF, FCZ-FCB, FCB-Aarau, FCW-FCB, FCB-FCSG, YF-FCB, FCB-FCB, FCB-OB, GC-FCB, FCSG-FCB

References

Sources
 Rotblau: Jahrbuch Saison 2017/2018. Publisher: FC Basel Marketing AG. 
 Die ersten 125 Jahre. Publisher: Josef Zindel im Friedrich Reinhardt Verlag, Basel. 
 Verein "Basler Fussballarchiv" Homepage
(NB: Despite all efforts, the editors of these books and the authors in "Basler Fussballarchiv" have failed to be able to identify all the players, their date and place of birth or date and place of death, who played in the games during the early years of FC Basel)

FC Basel players
Swiss men's footballers
Association football midfielders
Swiss Super League players
1967 deaths